Archibald Johnston (1611–1663) was a Scottish politician and judge.

Archibald Johnston(e) may also refer to:

Archibald D. Johnston (1940–2003), Alberta politician
Archibald Johnston (Bethlehem) (1864–1948), mayor of Bethlehem, Pennsylvania, and Bethlehem Steel executive
Archibald Johnston (died 1887), composer of the song "Illinois"

See also
Archie Johnstone (1896–1963), Scottish journalist and defector to the Soviet Union
Archibald Johnstone (1924–2014), Canadian politician and businessman
Archibald Johnson (disambiguation)